Baltic Station may refer to:

 Baltic Sea Naval Station, a command of the German navy
 Baltiysky railway station, a railway station in St. Petersburg, Russia
 Tallinn Baltic Station, a railway station in Tallinn, Estonia
 The name of Moscow Rizhsky railway station from 1930 to 1942